Viktoria Helgesson (born 13 September 1988) is a retired Swedish figure skater. She is the 2011 Skate America bronze medalist, a five-time (2008–11, 2013) Nordic champion, and an eight-time (2007–12, 2014–15) Swedish national champion. She placed fifth at three European Championships. Her bronze medal at 2011 Skate America is the first Grand Prix medal by a Swedish skater.

She and her sister Joshi are the only siblings to finish together in the top 5 of a major championship as single skaters, a feat achieved during the 2015 European Championships.

Personal life 
Viktoria Helgesson was born in Tibro, Sweden. Her younger sister, Joshi Helgesson, and their mother, Christina, have also competed in figure skating at the European Championships. She also has an older brother named Lukas and a father named Lenart.

Career
Helgesson began skating at the age of three, following in the footsteps of her mother. She is coached by her mother and Regina Jensen. At the age of 12, she landed her first triple jump, a Salchow.

Helgesson competed at the 2004 World Junior Championships, where she came in 22nd. In 2007, she won the Swedish national title for the first time at the senior level. She again competed at Junior Worlds, finishing 28th.

In 2008, Helgesson made her European Championships and World Championships debut, and came in 18th at both events. She improved upon her result at the 2009 European Championships, but failed to qualify for the free skate at that season's Worlds, and was thus unable to qualify an Olympic berth for Sweden.

In 2010, Helgesson finished 11th at the Europeans. Two months later, she improved her personal best by 19 points to finish tenth at Worlds. She consequently received two Grand Prix assignments in the 2010–11 season, the first of her career; she finished 9th at the 2010 NHK Trophy and 6th at that season's Skate America. She medalled at two international events, the 2010 Nebelhorn Trophy and the 2010 Merano Cup, and improved to 6th at the European Championships, the best finish by a Swedish figure skater since 1932. She was 17th at the 2011 World Championships.

In addition to Sweden, Helgesson also trained in Colorado and Boston. She began the 2011–12 season at the 2011 Nebelhorn Trophy, where she finished 5th. In October 2011, Helgesson won the bronze medal at the 2011 Skate America, her first medal at a Grand Prix event, as well as the first by any Swedish skater. She achieved a career-best European placement, 5th, at the 2012 and 2013 European Championships.

Helgesson represented Sweden at the 2014 Winter Olympics in Sochi. She placed fifth at the 2015 European Championships in Stockholm, Sweden. In April 2015, she retired from competition.

Programs

Competitive highlights

GP: Grand Prix; CS: Challenger Series (began in the 2014–15 season); JGP: Junior Grand Prix

References

External links

 Viktoria Helgesson official website
 

1988 births
Living people
People from Tibro Municipality
Swedish female single skaters
Figure skaters at the 2014 Winter Olympics
Olympic figure skaters of Sweden
Sportspeople from Västra Götaland County
21st-century Swedish women